Boden Fortress Radio Bunker is a communications bunker, part of Boden Fortress, outside the city of Boden, Norrbotten, in northern Sweden. It was used for the first radio broadcast in Swedish history.

History 
The first radio station at the site was finished by 1914, originally built for the Swedish Navy, and was located south of Degerberget Fort on the "Great Mire" bog, also known as the "Radio Mire". The station was rebuilt as a communications bunker in 1916, a concrete construction with one floor above ground and another below ground, which was supposed to withstand fire from most weapons of that time. The original station was equipped with three 108-metre tall radio masts, while the new bunker had an antenna stretched between two 20-metre masts.

The bunker was first used for radiotelegraphy to keep Boden Fortress in contact with other parts of the country. It also played an important role during the First World War as a medium for exchange of prisoner of war telegrams between the Russian Empire and the Central Powers. Around 7,900 such telegrams were sent during one year. The station was also used for the contact with Sveagruva on Svalbard and for radiotelegraphy with ships in the Gulf of Bothnia.

At 15:00 local time on 12 July 1921, the first radio broadcast in Swedish history was sent from the bunker. Radio commissioner Axel Jenner conducted this historic broadcast, with the Swedish king Gustav V listening some 35 km away in Luleå.

Radiotjänst, the Swedish national radio broadcaster, took control of the broadcasts from the bunker in 1925. The bunker was put out of operation 1 January 1975 and ten years later in 1985, it was decommissioned by the Swedish Army. The bunker has since decayed, but in 2010 a project was initiated to have it declared a historic building.

Citations

References 
All sources in  unless otherwise noted.
Books

News

Online

External links 

Boden Radio 

Radio Bunker
Infrastructure completed in 1916
Radio in Sweden
Buildings and structures in Norrbotten County